Urolosia is a genus of moths in the subfamily Arctiinae. The genus was erected by Herbert Druce in 1898.

Species
 Urolosia albipuncta Druce, 1905
 Urolosia brodea Schaus, 1896
 Urolosia opalocincta Druce, 1898

References

Arctiinae